Mbalal  or M'Balel is a town and urban commune in the Trarza Region of south-western Mauritania.

In 2000 it had a population of 14,129.

References

External links
Images

Communes of Trarza Region